Asthenotricha strangulata is a moth in the family Geometridae first described by Claude Herbulot in 1953. It is found in the Democratic Republic of the Congo, Kenya, Tanzania and Uganda.

References

Moths described in 1953
Asthenotricha
Moths of Africa